Al-Orobah Football Club is a Saudi Arabian professional football club based in Sakakah, that competes in the second tier of Saudi football, the Prince Mohammad bin Salman League.

They won the 2012–13 Saudi First Division and were promoted to the Saudi Professional League, the top level of Saudi Arabian football for the first time in their history.

Honours
Saudi First Division
Winners (1): 2012–13
Saudi Second Division
Winners (1): 2007–08
Runners-up (1): 1998–99, 2020–21

Current squad

Notable players
 Ben Badi
 Abdulmajeed Al-Ruwaili

References

External links
Goalzz.com Profile
National-Football-Teams.com Profile
Slstat.com (2013-14 season Profile)
Soccerway.com Profile

Football clubs in Saudi Arabia
1975 establishments in Saudi Arabia
Association football clubs established in 1975
Football clubs in Sakakah